Morocco–Norway relations refer to bilateral relations between Morocco and Norway. Morocco has an embassy in Oslo whilst Norway has an embassy in Rabat.

1970s
In what has been called the Lillehammer affair, Moroccan citizen Ahmed Bouchikhi was assassinated in Lillehammer in 1973 by Mossad, who mistook Bouchikhi for Ali Hassan Salameh. Norway reacted with judicial prosecution of Mossad operatives.

2000s
The Norwegian embassy's alleged improper sheltering of 2 dual-citizenship children (of Khalid Skah and Cecilie Hopstock) during their escape in 2009, led to a diplomatic dispute between the two countries. The children stayed at the embassy for 3 days. On the following day, Norway's ambassador Bjørn Blokhus left Morocco. One year after the incident, Moroccan authorities had not approved any new ambassador from Norway.

Country comparison

See Also 
 Foreign relations of Morocco
 Foreign relations of Norway
 Moroccans in Norway

References

 
Norway
Bilateral relations of Norway